The Elves and the Shoemaker is a children's picture book by Jim La Marche. Published in 2003 by Chronicle Books, it is a retelling of the fairy tale of the same title.

Reception 
Kirkus gave the book a starred review, describing it as a "timeless tale will leave readers suffused with the pleasure of seeing gifts received and appreciated". A review from Publishers Weekly praised the book's illustrations.

Adaptation to film
Weston Woods produced an animated film of this book in 2004, narrated by Patrick Stewart.

See also
The Elves and the Shoemaker

References

2003 children's books
American picture books
Works based on fairy tales
Picture books based on fairy tales